The Andy Gibson was a steamboat that serviced the headwaters of the Mississippi River in the U.S. state of Minnesota from 1884 to 1894.  After her retirement, the ship was left in a drydock outside her home port of Aitkin, Minnesota, and gradually dismantled for parts.  The hull and drydock eventually sank out of sight.  It is thus unique among U.S. shipwrecks for still resting on a drydock cradle.  The Andy Gibson shipwreck (Smithsonian trinomial 21AK109) was listed on the National Register of Historic Places in 2012 for having state-level significance in the themes of commerce, engineering, entertainment/recreation, maritime history, non-aboriginal historic archaeology, and transportation.  It was nominated for comprising the rare and well-preserved remains of a Mississippi River steamboat.

See also
 National Register of Historic Places listings in Aitkin County, Minnesota

References

1884 ships
National Register of Historic Places in Aitkin County, Minnesota
Shipwrecks of the Mississippi River
Shipwrecks on the National Register of Historic Places in Minnesota
Steamboats of the Mississippi River
Transportation in Aitkin County, Minnesota